The Sheffield Supertram is a tram and tram-train network covering Sheffield and Rotherham in South Yorkshire, England. The infrastructure is owned by the South Yorkshire Passenger Transport Executive (SYPTE), with Stagecoach responsible for the operation and maintenance of rolling stock under a concession until 2024, under the brand name Stagecoach Supertram.

Interest in building a modern tram system for Sheffield had mounted during the 1980s. After detailed planning by SYPTE, the Supertram proposal was approved by Act of Parliament in 1991.  Construction of the network, incorporating several existing heavy rail sections as well as new track, was carried out in sections, allowing revenue services to start during 1994.  Early operations, hindered by a complex ticketing system and the initially small coverage area, had disappointing ridership figures.  In an effort to turn around the performance, operations were privatised to Stagecoach in 1997, at price of £1.15 million, who took over from South Yorkshire Supertram Limited. After management and operational changes, and further expansion of the system, ridership numbers rose considerably.

From 2008, interest had been expressed in hybrid tram-train operations, which would be able to use sections of the mainline rail network as well as tramways. During 2012 an experimental trial was planned, as this was to be the first deployment of tram-trains anywhere in the United Kingdom. The start of tram-train operations, using a purpose-built fleet of new Class 399 Stadler Citylink electric multiple units, was repeatedly delayed, but on 25 October 2018, operations of the new tram-train line commenced.

The Supertram network now consists of 50 stations across four colour-coded lines, the Blue, Purple, Yellow and Tram-Train (Black) routes, which connect with local and national bus and rail services and six park and ride sites.

History

Background and initial launch
In common with many British cities, Sheffield used to have an extensive tram network, the Sheffield Tramway (1873-1960).  This finally closed in October 1960, it then being argued that motorised buses offered superior economics.

The new Supertram network arose from ambitions held by the South Yorkshire Passenger Transport Executive (SYPTE), which had been assigned the role of public transport coordination in the area. SYPTE refined an earlier and more expansive light rail proposal to include pre-existing heavy rail alignments, in order to gain the required permissions to proceed, and deposited several Bills to Parliament in 1985–1990 to gain the necessary powers. Financial approval was given by the Department of Transport towards the end of 1990, allowing the  £240 million construction of the initial line to commence in 1991.

This line was opened in stages between 1994 and 1995.  The first section, located along a former heavy rail alignment to Meadowhall, opened on 21 March 1994. The network was operated by South Yorkshire Supertram Limited, a wholly owned subsidiary company of SYPTE established to run the venture.

In the early years, the scheme was viewed by some as a failure; passengers continued using cheaper and more frequent buses, and retailers complained about the disruption caused by the lengthy construction works. The complex ticketing system was also a source of irritation and confusion to passengers.  It became clear that projections for passenger numbers had been overly optimistic, and concern arose that the system represented poor value for money. The matter of who should bear the cost became an issue.

Review and privatisation
By 1996, the councils backing the Supertram brought in consultants to draw up options to address major operational and managerial problems. In December 1997, South Yorkshire Supertram Limited was privatised, and sold to Stagecoach for £1.15 million, substantially below the anticipated £80 million that the councils had hoped to raise to help pay off the accumulated debts, leaving several local councils with the long-term debt for the Supertram's establishment.  Under the terms of the deal struck by the Labour government, a reduction in operating costs was achieved, but it was calculated that the people of South Yorkshire were each paying 5p per week for the Supertram, which continued over many years. Stagecoach acquired the concession for the maintenance and operation of the Supertram network until 2024.

Increasing use - and decline
There were initially plans for Supertram to extend services to a greater area of South Yorkshire, such as lines to Barnsley and Doncaster, but progress has been restricted. According to BBC News, frustration was expressed amongst people outside of Sheffield that they were paying for something they do not use.

However, by 2014 plans to extend Supertram were in various stages of action, and patronage had gone up, from 7.8 million passenger journeys in 1996/97, to 15.0 million during 2011/12.  The increase in usage was credited to various factors. Industry publication Rail pointed towards changes to route patterns, the introduction of onboard conductors, ticket simplification and refurbishment of the trams themselves as having generated greater appeal amongst the public.

Between 2012 and 2017, the number of passengers and operating revenue declined; during 2016/17, the network carried 12.6 million passengers. Reasons presented for the reduction included the disruptive rail replacement effort across the network, which involved partial closures and the use of buses as temporary replacements, as well as the impact of cheaper petrol.

New tram-train services

The tram-train extension to Rotherham opened on 25 October 2018, using seven new Vossloh-built Class 399 Citylink articulated electric multiple units. Trams operate on Network Rail's line from Tinsley to Rotherham station and beyond to the Parkgate shopping centre, where services terminate on a short spur at the side of the railway, after travelling on the Supertram line from Cathedral to Meadowhall South/Tinsley. The station at Rotherham Central is a combined tram stop and railway station, with platforms 1 and 2 at Rotherham Central extended, with the new extensions numbered platforms 3 and 4 respectively. The stop at Parkgate is a single platform terminus. The first test run of the tram-train service (as far as Magna) was performed in the early hours of 10 May 2018, and the first gauging run all the way to Parkgate occurred in the early hours of 5 June 2018.

The existing Siemens-Duewag Supertram fleet were not upgraded for tram-train operation, so were not registered under TOPS and cannot be used on the line as they lack the relevant Network Rail safety systems and crashworthiness. The tram-train scheme was first planned to be in service by 2015 but was delayed.

The Class 399 units were built in 2015/16 with the first delivered in December 2015. Until the completion of the tram-train line, some were used to provide increased capacity on the existing Supertram network. They first entered service on 14 September 2017.

On the opening day of tram-train passenger operations the service was suspended following a road traffic collision on the tram network involving one of the tram-train vehicles. The incident was caused by lorry operated by Ability Handling passing a red traffic light and caused the tram to be derailed.  The service has also been suspended twice after faults were found on the Citylink units. The first suspension was on 9 April 2019, when the fleet was withdrawn to undergo safety checks, although service resumed the next day. The service was later suspended again on 14 December 2019, resuming three days later on 17 December. Services have also operated on a reduced frequency several times whilst work has been undertaken on the Citylink fleet.

Potential return to public ownership

On 18 October 2022 the South Yorkshire Mayor Oliver Coppard announced that the service will return to public ownership once Stagecoach's operating contract expires in March 2024 alongside a £100 million grant by the central government to modernise parts of the system.

Summary of opening dates
 21 March 1994: Fitzalan Square to Meadowhall
 22 August 1994: Fitzalan Square to Spring Lane
 5 December 1994: Spring Lane to Gleadless Townend
 18 February 1995: Fitzalan Square to Cathedral
 27 February 1995: Cathedral to Shalesmoor
 27 March 1995: Gleadless Townend to Halfway
 3 April 1995: Gleadless Townend to Herdings Park
 23 October 1995: Shalesmoor to Middlewood/Malin Bridge
 25 October 2018: Tinsley/Meadowhall South to Parkgate (tram-train)

Current network

Routes

The South Yorkshire Supertram network is organised around Park Square and consists of four lines - Yellow, Blue, Purple and Tram-Train (black on maps)

The lines, with termini at Meadowhall Interchange, Parkgate, Halfway and Hillsborough, all serve Sheffield city centre and meet at Park Square where a triangular junction was constructed to provide interchange between lines and operational flexibility. A pair of small branches serving Malin Bridge, from Hillsborough Interchange, and Herdings Park branch out from two of the main lines.

The Supertram runs from Sheffield City Centre north-west to Middlewood and Malin Bridge via the University of Sheffield and Hillsborough; north-east to Meadowhall Interchange and Rotherham Parkgate via Attercliffe; and south-east to Halfway and Herdings Park via Norfolk Park, Manor, and Gleadless.

The three main City Centre stops are located on one side of a former dual carriageway, now a single lane and reserved for buses and taxis only. These three stops are served by all routes.

Stops
The tram stops on each of the four routes are as follows:

Frequencies
The off-peak daytime frequencies are:
 Yellow Line - 12 minutes
 Blue Line - 12 minutes
 Purple Line - 30 minutes
 Tram Train - 20 minutes

A reduced level of service was introduced across the Supertram network on 23 March 2020, in response to the COVID-19 pandemic in the United Kingdom. A modified Sunday timetable was in operation, until services were further reduced to hourly on 1 April.

Onward transport links

Stagecoach Sheffield formerly operated the SL1 and SL1a "SupertramLink" routes between the Middlewood terminus of the yellow route and Stocksbridge, via Oughtibridge. The bus ran at the same frequency as the tram and was timetabled to connect with the tram at Middlewood. Through single, return, day and week tickets were available to allow travel on both Supertram and SupertramLink bus services. On 1 June 2020, Stagecoach withdrew the dedicated SupertramLink bus from Middlewood to Stocksbridge, providing an enhanced service on local bus service 57 from Hillsborough to Stocksbridge in its place.

Rolling stock

Current fleet
Stagecoach Supertram operates the following fleet across the network:

Siemens-Duewag Supertram

The network operates 25 three car trams built by Siemens-Duewag of Düsseldorf, Germany, in 1992. The trams are 40% low floor design, the vehicles have been specially designed for gradients as steep as 10%.

Launched in an initial light grey livery, following the awarding of the operating franchise to Stagecoach the trams were reliveried in Stagecoach's corporate livery from 1997. From 2006 the trams were refurbished, and a new dedicated Supertram blue–based livery was launched, with the entire fleet completed in early 2009.

Stadler Citylink (Class 399)

Stadler supplied seven tram-train vehicles, delivered between November 2015 and November 2016.

Infrastructure

Track

It features two types of track; tramway track where either pedestrians or road traffic share the right of way and ballasted railway track when there are no such requirements.

Tramway track consists of a grooved tramway rail set into a concrete base with troughs into which the rails are laid. Most of the track is on-street using 35G-section grooved tram rail, with BS11-80A  flat-bottom rail elsewhere. The railway track was supplied by British Steel Corporation Track Products of Workington and laid on sleepers consisting of concrete blocks with steel ties which gives a spring feeling when travelling on these sections. The track is laid on a bed of ballast which in turn rests on a prepared formation. Street crossings are usually laid with grooved tramway rails.

There are some major structures. Two viaducts carry Supertram onto Park Square (a major road junction in the centre of the city), one of them being a six-span viaduct, the other the bowstring steel arch Park Square Bridge. An underpass takes the tram underneath the busy A57 roundabout outside the University of Sheffield.

Tram stop design

The design incorporates recommendations made by the Cranfield Institute of Technology who studied ergonomics for both able-bodied and disabled users.

Directional guidance tactile paving crosses the width of the platform to coincide with the tram door locations.

Power supply
Supertram is powered through 12 electric substations and fed through  cross-section overhead line equipment (OHLE) wire. The substations convert the 11 kV AC supply into  supply into the overhead. The 12 substations are situated as follows:

 Blackburn Meadows
 Carbrook
 Nunnery Square
 Park Square
 Arbourthorne
 Gleadless Townend
 Birley
 Crystal Peaks, Ochre Dyke Lane
 Halfway, Eckington Way
 University, Brook Hill
 Langsett Road, Capel Street
 Middlewood

The overhead line equipment depends on the location. If the tracks are close together, central poles with 'steady' arms on each side are used. If the tracks are further apart, poles on either side with span wire are used. With aesthetics in mind, a minimum number of traction poles are used and whenever possible the wire is anchored onto neighbouring buildings, and blended into the structures as far as possible, after talks between Supertram, the City Council and landlords.

The contact wires are twin cadmium copper ones, twin wires being necessary because of the high installed power rating of the trams (1megawatt). The regenerative braking on the tram feeds current back into the wires.

Depot

There is a single depot, located at Nunnery Square, which occupies former carriage sidings alongside the Sheffield to Lincoln railway line.

Before the arrival of Supertram, the site was already dedicated to the railway industry. Nunnery engine shed filled most of the site whilst lines of the Midland Railway, Great Central Railway and London & North Eastern Railway irrigated the area and served collieries.

Rules of operation
The rules of operation of the South Yorkshire Supertram are similar to those of a traditional railway.  But unlike normal trains, tramways can be operated without signalling, although block signalling is sometimes necessary on single-line sections. The trams are driven on a line-of-sight basis, so that the tram can be stopped if an obstruction is spotted ahead.

The route a tram is to take is computer-controlled. The route is set on a device in the tram before a journey is started, and on approach to junctions, a signal is sent from the tram to a device known as a VIS loop buried beneath the track. This automatically sets the points in the correct direction.
Signals, however, are used to give indications to tram drivers when running on-street and at street crossings. As trams have priority at many places, it was necessary to give them different traffic light phases from motor traffic and therefore different types of indication have to be used from those applicable to motor vehicles. Signal phases for the tramway are specifically modified to account for the length of the tram. The tram signals are usually operated alongside and in conjunction with traffic signals. Signals consist of white lights arranged vertically (for go), horizontally (for stop) and a cross (for caution). Two other light arrangement indicate a point direction at junctions.

Points indicators are provided at junctions to indicate the route which is set through the points. At junctions where Supertram and train movements can conflict with road traffic, fixed signals are provided in addition to points indicators. A points indicator may only be passed if it displays the correct route indication for the tram concerned and, where fixed signals are provided, if both points indicators and fixed signals are set for the correct route.

Lineside signals give instructions or warnings to tram drivers. To distinguish them from normal road signs, they are diamond-shaped. The most common are speed restrictions, which are in miles per hour. These are particularly necessary on road-running where trams travel along with road traffic.

Fares and ticketing
Prior to the Stagecoach takeover, ticketing was done via ticket machines, provided by Abberfield Technology of Australia. These blue ticket machines dispensed adult single ride tickets, senior citizen concessionary tickets and child concessionary tickets. As well as singles, the machines sold multi-packs at a discount. Fare tables were shown on the machines with the validity of the different prices. To travel, each ticket had to be validated in a yellow machine on the platform. The ticket defined the type of passenger and trip. On validation, an overprint was added, giving the tramstop code, time and date of validation and the point of validation.

As the machines did not dispense change, nearby shop-owners were often asked for change to purchase tickets from the machines. There were also problems with machine reliability. Just prior to Stagecoach taking over Supertram a move was made to remove the ticket machines and begin selling tickets on board using conductors. This change brought two key positives: an improved staff presence on board each tram, and meant that passenger's tickets could be systematically checked.

Stagecoach Sheffield period tickets are valid on the trams and on Stagecoach buses, and period SYPTE tickets covering Sheffield or the whole of South Yorkshire are valid on Supertram as well as buses and trains. Unlike some other tramway and light rail operators in England, Supertram accepts concessionary travel passes issued by any English local authority. PlusBus tickets are accepted as well.

In January 2020 the option to pay for a ticket via credit/debit card, along with other contactless methods of payment (such as Google Pay and Apple Pay), was introduced to all trams. Up until this point the only payment method onboard was cash.

In October 2020, £2.6million was allocated to Stagecoach Supertram to make up for lost revenue caused by the Coronavirus outbreak.

Corporate affairs

Ownership and structure
The system is owned by the South Yorkshire Passenger Transport Executive (SYPTE), which in turn is controlled by the South Yorkshire Mayoral Combined Authority, which consists of representatives from the metropolitan boroughs of Sheffield, Rotherham, Doncaster, and Barnsley.

Supertram is operated through an exclusive concession agreement between SYPTE and South Yorkshire Supertram Ltd (SYSL), now a wholly owned subsidiary of Stagecoach Holdings PLC. SYSL holds the concession to operate and maintain the network until 31 March 2024.

Business trends
Full financial figures do not appear to be published for the South Yorkshire Supertram; SYPTE produces its own annual accounts, but profit and loss figures for the tram operations are not shown separately.
The key available trends in recent years for South Yorkshire Supertram are (years ending 31 March):

Activities in the financial year 2020/21 were severely reduced by the impact of the coronavirus pandemic.

Passenger numbers
Detailed passenger journeys since Supertram commenced operations in May 1994 were:

Proposed developments
A number of extensions to the Supertram network have been proposed.

In May 2003, the South Yorkshire Passenger Transport Authority announced plans to extend the Supertram network to Hellaby, a suburb of Rotherham; Dore, a suburb of Sheffield; and Ranmoor, Sheffield. None of these extensions has been built.

In August 2008, plans were announced for the trial of diesel-electro hybrid tram trains on a route via Network Rail tracks to Huddersfield via Meadowhall, Barnsley and Penistone. The fleet of five tram trains, costing £9 million was expected to be in operation by the end of 2010 with the whole project costing £24 million for the 37-mile route. It was planned that the hourly Northern Rail service from Sheffield to Huddersfield via the Penistone line would be scrapped, being replaced by a more frequent tram service with more stops and a faster service due to the trams' more rapid acceleration. Plans were also announced for a second trial between Rotherham Central and Sheffield at the same time.

The Sheffield to Huddersfield plans were later abandoned in September 2009, although the Sheffield to Rotherham route was to go ahead. The scheme was estimated to require £15 million, later revised upwards to £18.7 million to build when first proposed, but was eventually expected to cost £75.1 million. The Rotherham route was originally intended to begin operation in 2015, however this date was put back several times until the October 2018 opening date after a series of delays. Part of the delay was due to the transport secretary failing to approve the building of a 150m (164yd) section of track at Tinsley in a timely manner. The Public Accounts Committee (PAC) was critical of Network Rail's initial estimates for the cost of modifications to the route calling them, "wholly unrealistic". The PAC also noted that Network Rail and the Department for Transport could not provide figures on how much money had been spent on a now cancelled line electrification project. Part of the unexpected rise in the cost of creating the route and the delay was due to the need to demolish and rebuild the College Road road over-bridge next to Rotherham Central station. It was thought that the ballast beneath the railway line could have been excavated to provide headroom for the catenary but this proved not to be feasible.

In 2017, the Sheffield City Region invited public consultation on The Sheffield City Region Transport Strategy 2018-2040 policy document (draft for consultation November 2017) in which it was revealed that only 1% of the population used the Supertram network on journeys to work in 2011.
The number of passengers on the Supertram network increased from 2 million in the 1994/1995 financial years to over 12 million in the 2016/2017 financial years.

There are plans to re-route the tram line from behind Sheffield station to where Sheaf Street is currently located as part of a £1.5 billion plan to redevelop the station and surrounding area.

There are also plans to build a new stop on the Tram Train route outside Magna Science Adventure Centre.

In April 2022, the Sheffield Green Party unveiled their plans for the system, with extensions planned across South Yorkshire.

Accidents and incidents
 In 1995, engineer William Roe suffered severe brain damage after his car skidded on wet tram tracks and crashed into a metal pole. Supertram were made to award Mr Roe compensation for failing to ensure that the rails were level with the adjacent road surface, and for the lack of warning signs indicating that the tracks are hazardous when wet. It was reported there were 53 accidents involving Supertram in Sheffield between 1994 and 1997, including two fatalities and 12 serious injuries.
 On 7 March 2003, a man died from serious head injuries after he was hit by a tram whilst lying on the tracks.
 On 27 October 2005, a pedestrian was killed after stepping in front of an approaching tram.
 On 20 September 2008, a 75-year-old woman was seriously injured when she fell and was subsequently struck by a tram while it was arriving at the local tram stop. The woman was removed and transferred to the Northern General Hospital, suffering from head injuries, a fractured pelvis, and a broken leg.
 On 22 October 2015, trams 120 and 118 collided at Shalesmoor. This resulted in the two damaged sections of both trams requiring major repairs, whilst the undamaged parts of trams 120 and 118 were put together and painted in a version of the original Sheffield Tramways cream and blue livery to re-create the original 120. Tram 118 returned to service a year later in October 2016.
 In November 2016, teacher Terry Orwin sustained serious head injuries from crashing while riding a bicycle on Langsett Road and being caught by the tram tracks.
 In December 2016, Saleh Qassim Saleh, 81, was killed in a collision with a tram. The driver was charged with causing death by careless driving.
 In June 2017, two trams were involved in a low-speed collision at Halfway.
 In July 2018 a passenger was injured when they were thrown across the tram as a result tram overspeeding at Middlewood Road and then braking suddenly. The impact of the passenger with a door caused the door to open.
 On 25 October 2018, the day the Tram-train service launched, a lorry collided with one such tram at approximately 3.30pm on Staniforth Road, near the Woodbourn Road station, derailing the tram-train. Three people were injured with two being treated on site and one taken to hospital. Initial reports indicate that the lorry pulled across the path of the Tram-train. On 12 August 2019, lorry driver Kevin Hague, 61, of Rotherham admitted driving through a red light at Sheffield Magistrates' Court. The BBC reported, 'In a personal impact statement read to the court the driver of the tram-train said he was thankful he was in one of the new £4M vehicles. They are built to higher crash-worthiness standards as they also run on Network Rail tracks.'
 On 30 November 2018, a car collided with a tram-train at approximately 4.30pm on Staniforth Road.
 On 22 May 2019, a man was hit by a tram shortly after having an argument with two men. He later died on 26 May 2019 and was named as Martin Rigg. A man was arrested on suspicion of murder on 1 June 2019.
 On 23 July 2021, tram 105 was derailed in a collision with a lorry on Cricket Inn Road. One person was taken to hospital with minor injuries.
 On 11 April 2022, tram 121 crashed into a police van near Leppings Lane. The van driver was taken to hospital with a broken leg.

See also
 Sheffield Tramway – the original Sheffield tramway system.
 Light Rail Transit Association
 List of town tramway systems in England
 List of town tramway systems in the United Kingdom

References
Notes

Citations

External links

 Supertram website
 Stagecoach Supertram at thetrams.co.uk
 Collection of Google Earth locations of Stagecoach Supertram stops (Requires Google Earth software) from the Google Earth Community forum.
 Supertram specs
 Gallery of Sheffield's Supertram

 
Stagecoach Group rail services
Railway lines opened in 1994
1994 establishments in England
Light rail in the United Kingdom
Tram transport in England
750 V DC railway electrification